Alpinia aquatica, aquatic ginger, is a species of ginger native from South India to Western Malesia. It was first described by Anders Jahan Retzius and renamed by William Roscoe.

References

aquatica